A rifled muzzle loader (RML) is a type of large artillery piece invented in the mid-19th century. In contrast to smooth bore cannon which preceded it, the rifling of the gun barrel allowed much greater accuracy and penetration as the spin induced to the shell gave it directional stability. Typical guns weighed 18 tonnes with 10-inch-diameter bores, and were installed in forts and ships.

This new gun and the rifled breech loader (RBL) generated a huge arms race in the late 19th century, with rapid advances in fortifications and ironclad warships.

Royal Navy experience
The largest rifled muzzle-loader carried on a warship was the 17.7-inch, 100-ton Elswick of the 1870s, four of which were installed in each of the Italian battleships Duilio and Enrico Dandolo (launched in 1872).  The Royal Navy at the time was restricted to the weapons produced by Woolwich Arsenal, so that the heaviest guns that could be shipped were the 80-ton 16-inch guns of HMS Inflexible.

Introduction of the Armstrong rifled breechloaders (RBL) into the Royal Navy in 1860 was not very successful. The action of Kagosima on 14 August 1863 led to 28 accidents in 365 rounds fired. Following this experience, the Royal Navy reverted to the muzzle-loader until the early 1880s.  Other navies, notably France, continued to develop and deploy RBLs, but they were hardly superior in rate of fire or muzzle energy to their British counterparts.

During this period rapid burning black powder was used as the propellant, so the guns had a stubby, 'soda bottle' shape giving easy access to either end for loading.  The RBLs of the time were notably weaker in the breech region, and more prone to failure.

A catastrophic accident on board HMS Thunderer in January 1879, in which a 35-ton 12-inch muzzle-loader hung fire and was subsequently double-loaded, motivated the Admiralty to re-consider the RBL.

Improvements in breech mechanisms in the period 1860 to 1880, together with the introduction of large-grain powder, caused the Navy to re-adopt the RBL as the new powder required longer barrels which could not be withdrawn into the turret for loading.  A new 12-inch gun was developed for HMS Edinburgh in 1879, but burst during trials.  Following modifications the new weapon proved reliable.

See also
 Muzzle-loading rifle
 Parrott rifle
 Brooke rifle
 James rifle

References
 Dr Oscar Parkes- British Battleships, Seeley, Service & Co., London. 1973

Artillery